Gallowgate can refer to:

Gallowgate, Newcastle upon Tyne, England
Gallowgate, Glasgow, Scotland, a thoroughfare running east–west from Glasgow Cross to Parkhead Cross, part of the A89 road
Gallowgate, Glasgow, a neighbourhood of the city adjacent to the aforesaid main road
Gallowgate, Aberdeen, an old street in Aberdeen

See also
Gallowgate Barracks, built 1795 and now demolished, Glasgow
Gallowgate Central railway station, a former railway station in Glasgow